Rodney Ashman (born 3 December 1954) is a former Australian rules footballer who represented  in the Victorian Football League (VFL).

Playing primarily in the forward pocket, Ashman was a member of Carlton's famous "Mosquito Fleet" which was pivotal to the club's success in the late 1970s and early 1980s. He played in back-to-back premierships in 1981 and 1982.

Ashman's courageous style of play saw him suffer frequent concussion. After getting concussed several times in the space of a month, Ashman wore a helmet for the rest of his career. Although he didn't like it, he realised its value in a match against  where he got kicked in the head, but was protected by the helmet. When he suffered a stroke in May 2010, Ashman wondered whether it was the result of one of those concussions he sustained during his playing days.
 
Ashman was inducted into Carlton's Hall of Fame in 1993 and was later named in the forward pocket in Carlton's Team of the Century.

References

External links 

Profile on blueseum.org

1954 births
Living people
Australian rules footballers from Victoria (Australia)
Carlton Football Club players
Carlton Football Club Premiership players
Eaglehawk Football Club players
Two-time VFL/AFL Premiership players